Collen Brook Farm, also known as Collenbrook, is a historic home and associated buildings located in Upper Darby, Delaware County, Pennsylvania. The complex includes three contributing buildings: a farmhouse, a granite spring house (c. 1782), and stone and frame carriage house (c. 1870).  The house is a -story, vernacular stone residence with a Georgian plan and consisting of three sections.  The oldest section was built around 1700, with additions made in 1774, and 1794.  It was the home of noted educator and political leader George Smith (1804–1882).

It was added to the National Register of Historic Places in 1988.

The 18th-century period farmhouse house is owned by the Upper Darby Historical Society and open to the public on Sunday afternoons from May through October.

References

External links
 Upper Darby Historical Society

Houses completed in 1700
Houses completed in 1794
Houses on the National Register of Historic Places in Pennsylvania
Georgian architecture in Pennsylvania
Houses in Delaware County, Pennsylvania
Museums in Delaware County, Pennsylvania
Historic house museums in Pennsylvania
National Register of Historic Places in Delaware County, Pennsylvania
1700 establishments in Pennsylvania